Carli Mosier (born February 28, 1978) is an American voice actress and political activist, who has worked for Funimation, ADV Films and Seraphim Digital/Sentai Filmworks. She is also a board member for the River Oaks Area Democratic Women (ROADWomen).

Mosier has provided voices for a number of English-language versions Japanese anime series.

Early life
Mosier was born on February 28, 1978, in Houston, Texas. She is the daughter of Bruce Debs Mosier (1936-2017) and Diane Mosier (1948-2018) who were members of the Democratic Party and is one of four children in the family. Mosier at a young age attended Kinder High School for the Performing and Visual Arts and the University of Houston.

Voice acting
Mosier voiced characters on many anime shows starting with Another which was her voice acting debut in 2012. She also starred in Mythical Detetive Loki Ragnarok and Godannar. She voiced Yukika in Nerima Daikon Brothers, and Yuri Kurosu in Magikano She also voices Wilhelmina in Shakugan no Shana, Astraea in Heaven's Lost Property, Akira Yoshii in Baka and Test, Rin Tohsaka in Fate/kaleid liner Prisma Illya, Yuko Amamiya in Ef: A Fairy Tale of the Two, and Toko Fukawa in Danganronpa: The Animation.

Personal life
She is married to Dustin Faigen and resides in River Oaks. As she is involved in voice acting, Mosier has used platform to engage fans in political discussions and organizing with a convention panel called "Anime and Activism".

Filmography

Anime

Film

References

External links

ROADWomen profile

Living people
Actresses from Houston
American voice actresses
21st-century American actresses
University of Houston alumni
1978 births